was a town located in Yuri District, Akita Prefecture, Japan.

In 2003, the town had an estimated population of 5,011 and a density of 277.16 persons per km². The total area was 18.08 km².

On October 1, 2005, Konoura, along with the town of Kisakata, was merged into the town of Nikaho (all from Yuri District) to become the city of Nikaho.

External links
 Nikaho official website 

Dissolved municipalities of Akita Prefecture
Nikaho, Akita